Dauphin County (Pennsylvania Dutch: Daffin Kaundi) is a county in the Commonwealth of Pennsylvania. As of the 2020 census, the population was 286,401. The county seat and the largest city is Harrisburg, Pennsylvania's state capital and ninth largest city. The county was created on March 4, 1785, from part of Lancaster County and was named after Louis Joseph, Dauphin of France, the first son of King Louis XVI.

Dauphin County is included in the Harrisburg–Carlisle Metropolitan Statistical Area.

Located within the county is Three Mile Island Nuclear Generating Station, site of the 1979 nuclear core meltdown. The nuclear power plant closed in 2019.

Geography
The county is bound to its western border by the Susquehanna River (with the exception of a small peninsula next to Duncannon). The area code is 717 with an overlay of 223.

Adjacent counties
Northumberland County (north)
Schuylkill County (northeast)
Lebanon County (east)
Lancaster County (south)
York County (southwest)
Cumberland County (west)
Perry County (west)
Juniata County (northwest)

Major roads and highways

 SR 3032

Climate
Most of the county by area has a humid continental climate (Dfa except for some Dfb in highlands.) The inclusion of temperature numbers for the past decade shows some lower-lying areas, including Harrisburg, to have a humid subtropical climate (Cfa.) The hardiness zone ranges from 6a to 7a.

Demographics

As of the 2010 census, the county was 72.7% White, 18.0% Black or African American, 0.2% Native American, 3.2% Asian, and 3.1% were two or more races. 7.0% of the population were of Hispanic or Latino ancestry.

As of the census of 2000, there were 251,798 people, 102,670 households, and 66,119 families residing in the county.  The population density was 479 people per square mile (185/km2).  There were 111,133 housing units at an average density of 212 per square mile (82/km2).  The racial makeup of the county was 77.11% White, 16.91% Black or African American, 0.16% Native American, 1.96% Asian, 0.03% Pacific Islander, 1.97% from other races, and 1.85% from two or more races.  4.13% of the population were Hispanic or Latino of any race. 29.2% were of German, 7.5% Irish, 7.3% American and 7.2% Italian ancestry. 91.8% spoke English and 3.9% Spanish as their first language.

According to 2005 estimates, 73.9% of the county's population was non-Hispanic whites.  17.8% of the population was African-Americans.  2.5% were Asians.  Latinos now were 5.0% of the population.

In 2000 there were 102,670 households, out of which 29.70% had children under the age of 18 living with them, 47.60% were married couples living together, 12.90% had a female householder with no husband present, and 35.60% were non-families. 30.00% of all households were made up of individuals, and 10.30% had someone living alone who was 65 years of age or older.  The average household size was 2.39 and the average family size was 2.98.

In the county, the population was spread out, with 24.30% under the age of 18, 7.60% from 18 to 24, 30.10% from 25 to 44, 23.80% from 45 to 64, and 14.20% who were 65 years of age or older.  The median age was 38 years. For every 100 females, there were 92.30 males.  For every 100 females age 18 and over, there were 88.80 males.

A study by Echelon Insights found Dauphin County to be the most typical county in America, with its 2016 presidential vote, median income, higher education rate, and religiosity all very close to the national averages.

2020 Census

Amish community
Dauphin County is home to an Amish community that resides in the Lykens Valley in the northern part of the county, consisting of eight church districts. The community was settled by Amish from Lancaster County seeking cheaper land.

Metropolitan Statistical Area
The United States Office of Management and Budget has designated Dauphin County as the Harrisburg-Carlisle, PA Metropolitan Statistical Area (MSA).  As of the 2010 U.S. Census the metropolitan area ranked 5th most populous in the State of Pennsylvania and the 96th most populous in the United States with a population of 549,475.  Dauphin County is also a part of the larger Harrisburg–York–Lebanon combined statistical area (CSA), which combines the populations of Dauphin County as well as Adams, Cumberland, Lebanon, Perry and York Counties in Pennsylvania.  The combined statistical area ranked the 5th most populous in Pennsylvania and 43rd most populous in the nation with a population of 1,219,422.

Politics and government

|}

Dauphin County was historically a Republican stronghold, like most of south-central Pennsylvania. It was long one of the more conservative urban counties in the nation, having only supported a Democrat for president twice from 1880 to 2004.  However, there has been a decided shift toward the Democrats in national and statewide elections in recent years. This culminated when the Democrats overtook the Republicans in countywide registration during the summer of 2008. As of November 1, 2021, 45.5% of registered voters in the county were Democrats, 38.9% Republicans, and 15.5% other party/non-affiliated. Bob Casey Jr. carried the county in the 2006 Senate election when he unseated Rick Santorum. According to the Dauphin County Board of Elections, in 2008 Barack Obama became the first Democratic presidential candidate to carry Dauphin County since 1964, receiving 9.0% more of the vote than John McCain. It was also only the third time Dauphin County had supported a Democrat for president since 1936. Obama won Dauphin with a slightly reduced majority in 2012, while Hillary Clinton won it with a narrow plurality in 2016. It is now the only blue county in the traditionally powerfully Republican Susquehanna Valley.

Nonetheless, the GOP still holds all of the county row offices, as well as a majority on the county commission.  Three of the state house seats are held by Democrats. Republicans control two state house seats as well as both of the state senate seats and the congressional seat. Most local elected officials are also Republican, by a margin of 3 to 1. This is because most of the Democratic gains have been in already heavily Democratic Harrisburg, which has had a Democratic mayor since 1982 and has been represented in the state house by a Democrat since 1975. In contrast, the suburbs and rural areas remain some of the most Republican areas in Pennsylvania.

Party registration stats according to the Secretary of State's office:

County commissioners
Michael Pries, Chairman, Republican
Chad Saylor, Vice Chairman, Republican
George P. Hartwick III, Secretary, Democrat

Other county offices

Clerk of Courts, Dale Klein, Republican
Controller, Jim Markel (acting), Republican
Coroner, Graham Hetrick, Republican
District Attorney, Fran Chardo, Republican
Prothonotary, Matt Krupp, Republican
Recorder of Deeds, Jim Zugay, Republican
Register of Wills and Clerk of the Orphans' Court, Jean Marfizo King, Republican
Sheriff, Nick Chimienti, Republican
Treasurer, Janis Creason, Republican
Solicitor, Joseph A. Curcillo III, Esquire

State Representatives

Patty Kim, Democrat, 103rd district
Dave Madsen, Democrat, 104th district
Justin Fleming, Democrat, 105th district
Tom Mehaffie, Republican, 106th district
Joseph Kerwin, Republican, 125th district

State Senate
John DiSanto, Republican, 15th district
Greg Rothman, Republican, Pennsylvania Senate, District 34th district

United States House of Representatives
Scott Perry, Republican, 10th district

United States Senate

Education

Colleges and universities

Dixon University Center
Harrisburg Area Community College
Harrisburg University of Science and Technology
Penn State Harrisburg
Penn State Hershey Medical Center
Temple University Harrisburg Campus
Widener University School of Law

Public school districts
School districts include:

Central Dauphin School District
Derry Township School District
Halifax Area School District
Harrisburg School District (Pennsylvania)
Lower Dauphin School District
Middletown Area School District
Millersburg School District
Steelton-Highspire School District
Susquehanna Township School District
Susquenita School District (also in Perry County)
Upper Dauphin School District
Williams Valley School District (also in Schuylkill County)

Public charter schools
Several public charter schools are established in Dauphin County 
Infinity Charter School
Sylvan Heights Science Charter School
Capital Area School for the Arts
Premier Arts and Science Charter School

Intermediate unit
The Capital Area Intermediate Unit 15 is a state approved education agency that offers: school districts, charter schools, private schools, and home school students, a variety of services including: a completely developed K–12 curriculum that is mapped and aligned with the Pennsylvania Academic Standards (available online), shared services, a group purchasing program and  a wide variety of special education and special needs services.

Library system
The Dauphin County Library System provides library service to the residents of the county through a main central library in the state capital and county seat of Harrisburg, Pennsylvania and eight branch libraries. DCLS is a private, non-profit corporation. It is governed by a 17-member Board of Trustees, five appointed annually by the Dauphin County Commissioners, and twelve elected for three-year terms.  The Library is a member of the Pennsylvania library system.

Private schools
As reported by the National Center for Educational Statistics

Armstrong Valley Christian School – Halifax
Berrysburg Christian Academy – Elizabethvile
Bishop McDevitt High School – Harrisburg
Cathedral Consolidated School – Harrisburg
Covenant Christian Academy – Harrisburg
East Shore Montessori School – Harrisburg
Emmanuel Wesleyan Academy – Gratz
Garden Spot Amish School – Millersburg
Garden Spot School – Millersburg
Goddard School – Harrisburg
Hansel and Gretel Early Learning Centers – Harrisburg
Harrisburg Adventist School – Harrisburg
Harrisburg Christian School – Harrisburg
Hillside Amish School – Harrisville
Hillside Seventh Day Adventist School – Harrisburg
Keystone Math and Science Academy – Harrisburg
Kinder-Care Learning Center – Harrisburg
KinderCare Learning Center – Hershey
Londonderry School – Harrisburg
Mahantango School – Lykens
Matterstown School – Millersburg
Middletown Christian School – Middletown
Milton Hershey School – Hershey
North Mountain View Amish – Millersburg
Northern Dauphin Christian School – Millersburg
Pride of the Neighborhood Academies – Harrisburg
Rakers Mill School – Elizabethville
Rolling Acres School – Lykens
Seven Sorrows of BMV School – Middletown
Sonshine Learning Station – Middletown
South Mountain View School – Spring Glen
Specktown School – Lykens
St. Catherine Laboure School – Harrisburg
St Joan of Arc Elementary School – Hershey
St. Margaret Mary School – Harrisburg
St. Stephen's Episcopal School – Harrisburg
Tender Years Inc. – Hershey
The Nativity School of Harrisburg – Harrisburg
Windy Knoll School – Spring Glen
Wordsworth Academy – Harrisbrug
Yeshiva Academy – Harrisburg

Economy
The largest employers in Dauphin County in 2019 were:

Commonwealth Government 
Milton S. Hershey Medical Center 
The Hershey Company 
Hershey Entertainment & Resorts Co. 
UPMC Pinnacle Hospitals
Federal Government 
Pennsylvania State University 
PHEAA – Pennsylvania Higher Education Assistance Agency
United Parcel Service Inc
TYCO Electronics Corp.

Recreation
There are two Pennsylvania state parks in Dauphin County.
Boyd Big Tree Preserve Conservation Area
Joseph E. Ibberson Conservation Area

Communities

Under Pennsylvania law, there are four types of incorporated municipalities: cities, boroughs, townships, and, in at most two cases, towns. The following cities, boroughs and townships are located in Dauphin County:

City
Harrisburg (county seat)

Boroughs
Berrysburg
Dauphin
Elizabethville
Gratz
Halifax
Highspire
Hummelstown
Lykens
Middletown
Millersburg
Paxtang
Penbrook
Pillow
Royalton
Steelton
Williamstown

Townships

Conewago
Derry
East Hanover
Halifax
Jackson
Jefferson
Londonderry
Lower Paxton
Lower Swatara
Lykens
Middle Paxton
Mifflin
Reed
Rush
South Hanover
Susquehanna
Swatara
Upper Paxton
Washington
Wayne
West Hanover
Wiconisco
Williams

Census-designated places
Census-designated places are geographical areas designated by the U.S. Census Bureau for the purposes of compiling demographic data. They are not actual jurisdictions under Pennsylvania law. Other unincorporated communities, such as villages, may be listed here as well.

Bressler
Colonial Park
Enhaut
Hershey
Lawnton
Lenkerville
Linglestown
Oberlin
Palmdale
Paxtonia
Progress
Rutherford
Skyline View
Union Deposit
Wiconisco

Unincorporated communities

Bachmanville
Cartin
Chambers Hill
Clifton 
Dietrich 
Deodate 
Dayton
Carsonville 
Ebenezer 
Edgemont 
Ellendale Forge
Enders 
Enterline 
Erdman
Estherton 
Freys Grove 
Fort Hunter 
Grantville
Greenfield
Hanoverdale 
Heckton  
Hockersville 
Hoernerstown 
Inglenook 
Jednota 
Killinger
Loyalton
Lucknow 
Manada Gap 
Manada Hill 
Matamoras
Matterstown
Montrose Park
Oakleigh
Oakmont
Oberlin Gardens 
Paxtang Manor 
Piketown 
Powells Valley 
Rockville 
Sand Beach  
Shellsville  
Singersville 
Speeceville 
Swatara
Vaughn 
Waynesville

Population ranking
The population ranking of the following table is based on the 2010 census of Dauphin County.

† county seat

Notable people

 Milton S. Hershey (1857–1945), founder of The Hershey Company and the town of Hershey
 H.B. Reese (1879–1956), inventor of Reese's Peanut Butter Cups
Samuel B. Garver (1839–1911), an Illinois state representative, businessman, and farmer, was born in Dauphin County.
Nicholas H. Heck (1882–1953), a geophysicist, seismologist, oceanographer, hydrographic surveyor, and United States Coast and Geodetic Survey officer, was born in Dauphin County in Heckton Mills, near Heckton.
Michelle Wolf (1985–), comedian, was born and lived in Dauphin County

See also
 Hummelstown brownstone
 National Register of Historic Places listings in Dauphin County, Pennsylvania

Notes

References

External links

 Dauphin County official website 

 
1785 establishments in Pennsylvania
Harrisburg–Carlisle metropolitan statistical area
Populated places established in 1785
Susquehanna Valley